Kepler-27 is a star in the northern constellation of Cygnus, the swan. It is located at the celestial coordinates: Right Ascension , Declination . With an apparent visual magnitude of 15.855, this star is too faint to be seen with the naked eye.

Planetary system
The planetary system of Kepler-27 comprising two small gas giants on eccentric orbits was discovered in late 2011. The planets Kepler-27b and Kepler-27c have equilibrium temperatures of 610 K and 481 K, respectively. In 2021, a third, sub-Neptune-sized planet was confirmed, orbiting closer in than the other two planets.

References

Cygnus (constellation)
G-type main-sequence stars
841
Planetary transit variables
Planetary systems with three confirmed planets
J19285682+4105091